Chino (Spanish for "Curly") is a city in the western end of San Bernardino County, California, United States, with Los Angeles County to its west and Orange County to its south in the Southern California region. Chino is adjacent to Chino Hills, California. Chino's surroundings have long been a center of agriculture and dairy farming, providing milk products in Southern California and much of the southwestern United States. Chino's agricultural history dates back to the Spanish land grant forming Rancho Santa Ana del Chino. The area specialized in fruit orchards, row crops, and dairy.

Chino is bounded by Chino Hills and Los Angeles County to the west, Pomona to the northwest, unincorporated San Bernardino County (near Montclair) to the north, Ontario to the northeast, Eastvale to the southeast in Riverside County and Orange County to the southwest. It is easily accessible via the Chino Valley (71) and Pomona (60) freeways. The population was 77,983 at the 2010 census.

Downtown Chino is home to satellite branches of the San Bernardino County Library and Chaffey Community College, the Chino Community Theatre, the Chino Boxing Club and a weekly Farmer's Market. In 2008, the city of Chino was awarded the prestigious "100 Best Communities for Youth" award for the second time in three years.  Chino hosted shooting events for the 1984 Summer Olympics at the Prado Olympic Shooting Park in the Prado Regional Park.

Etymology
The land grant on which the town was founded was called Rancho Santa Ana del Chino.  Santa Ana is Spanish for Saint Anne, but the exact meaning of "Chino" has been explained in different ways. One explanation is that the "Chino" (curly-haired person or mixed-race person) was the chief of the local Native American village. The president of the Chino Valley Historical Society, drawing on Civil War-era letters, designates the "curl" referenced in the toponym as that at the top of the grama grass that abounded in the valley.

History
The Tongva had a settlement called Wapijangna in the Santa Ana River watershed. Some residents of Wapijanga were baptized at Mission San Gabriel, which was established in 1771. The Spanish crown claimed the land until Mexican independence was finalized and possession fell to the Mexican government.

Some twenty years later, Mexican governor of Alta California Juan Bautista Alvarado granted Rancho Santa Ana del Chino to Antonio Maria Lugo of the prominent Lugo family. Two years later, his successor, Governor Micheltorena, granted an additional three leagues to Lugo's son-in-law Isaac Williams, who took charge of the rancho. Williams kept large quantities of horses and cattle, which attracted the envy of raiding Native Americans as well as unscrupulous whites. One of the latter was James Beckwourth, who, in 1840, posed as an otter hunter and stayed at Rancho Chino to determine the location of the area's animals, which he then reported to Walkara, the Ute mastermind of the raids.

Early in the Mexican–American War, the Battle of Chino took place at Williams' rancho. The battle ended prior to the arrival of the Mormon Battalion, dispatched on behalf of the United States, who instead labored in the rancho's agricultural harvest and constructed a grist mill.

During the California Gold Rush, the rancho was a popular stopover for travelers, and in the mining fury, coal was discovered there. In 1850, California was admitted to the union, and the process of separating privately held lands from the public domain began. The Williams claim to the Chino Rancho was patented in 1869.

Richard Gird was the next owner of the Rancho. Beginning in 1887, his land was subdivided and laid out. It became the "Town of Chino," and incorporated into a city in 1910. Sugar beets, corn, and alfalfa were raised there.

Sugar beets were a significant part of the economy in the early 1900s, followed by sweet corn (marketed as "Chino corn" throughout the Pacific coast area), peaches, walnuts, tomatoes, and strawberries. The city's official logo/crest features an overflowing cornucopia.

The dairy industry flourished from the 1950s through the 1980s, with dairy-friendly zoning in the southwest corner of San Bernardino County encouraging many ethnic Dutch families to locate there and become the cornerstone of the industry. Chino's large, highly efficient dairies made it the largest milk-producing community in the nation's largest milk-producing state.

Because of its pastoral setting and rural flavor, Chino was a popular site for Hollywood crews to shoot "Midwestern" settings. 1960s movies included Bus Riley's Back in Town starring Ann-Margret and Michael Parks; The Stripper, with Joanne Woodward; and the mid-1960s TV series Twelve O'Clock High, refashioning Chino's rural airport into a British airfield with quonset huts among farm fields.

In the 1970s, Chino developed into a small suburban city, forming the western anchor of the Inland Empire region, and now the city's development has gradually taken on a more middle-class character. There are still many industrial areas as well as farm animals such as goats and chickens. According to the 2004 FBI UCR, the city had about 3.6 violent crimes per 1,000 population, which is typical for an American suburb, and its property crime below average.

On July 11, 2017, in a special election, Chino voters voted against Measure H, which would have allowed  of rural land located near Ontario to be used to build a total of 180 new homes by home builder D.R. Horton. The measure faced considerable opposition from city residents, despite support from the Chino Chamber of Commerce and school district.

Economy

Top employers
According to the city's 2011 Comprehensive Annual Financial Report, the top employers in the city are:

Two California state prisons for adults (California Institution for Men and California Institution for Women), as well as the Heman G. Stark Youth Correctional Facility, lie within the city limits.

Education
Chino is a part of the Chino Valley Unified School District.

Elementary schools
Chino has had 12 elementary schools:
 El Rancho Elementary (closed in 2008–2009 school year)
 Alicia Cortez Elementary
 Newman Elementary 
 E.J. Marshall Elementary
 Dickson Elementary
 Anna Borba Fundamental
 Howard Cattle Elementary
 Richard Gird Elementary (closed in 2008–2009 school year)
 Edwin Rhodes Elementary
 Cal Aero Preserve Academy
 Walnut Avenue Elementary
 Liberty Elementary

Junior high schools
Chino has four junior high schools:
 Briggs Junior High School
 Ramona Junior High School
 Magnolia Junior High School
 Woodcrest Junior High School

High schools
Chino has five high schools:
 Don Antonio Lugo High School
 Buena Vista High School
 Chino High School
Ayala High School
Chino Hills High School

Chino has one charter school:
 Oxford Preparatory Academy (Closed)
 Allegiance STEAM Academy

Chino has one Fundamental School:
Lyle S. Briggs Fundamental School (K-8th Grade)

Chino is serviced by a satellite center of Chaffey College, a community college.

Geography
Chino is located at  (34.017765, -117.689990).
 Los Angeles, 
 Riverside, 
 Santa Ana, 
 Anaheim,

Climate
According to the Köppen Climate Classification system, Chino has a hot-summer Mediterranean climate, abbreviated "Csa" on climate maps. Chino has long, hot summers with cool to mild mornings and short, mild, and wet winters with chilly mornings usually in the 40s. Precipitation peaks during the month of February.

Demographics

2010
At the 2010 census Chino had a population of 77,983. The racial makeup of Chino was 43,981 (56.4%) White (27.8% Non-Hispanic White), 4,829 (6.2%) African American, 786 (1.0%) Native American, 8,159 (10.5%) Asian, 168 (0.2%) Pacific Islander, 16,503 (21.2%) from other races, and 3,557 (4.6%) from two or more races. Hispanic or Latino people of any race were 41,993 persons (53.8%).

The census reported that 70,919 people (90.9% of the population) lived in households, 164 (0.2%) lived in non-institutionalized group quarters, and 6,900 (8.8%) were institutionalized.

There were 20,772 households, 9,979 (48.0%) had children under the age of 18 living in them, 12,426 (59.8%) were married couples living together, 3,041 (14.6%) had a female householder with no husband present, 1,469 (7.1%) had a male householder with no wife present. There were 1,185 (5.7%) households of unmarried couples; of which 147 (0.7%) were same-sex. 2,840 households (13.7%) were one person and 1,020 (4.9%) had someone living alone who was 65 or older. The average household size was 3.41. There were 16,936 families (81.5% of households); the average family size was 3.72.

The age distribution was 19,737 people (25.3%) under the age of 18, 8,530 people (10.9%) aged 18 to 24, 25,091 people (32.2%) aged 25 to 44, 18,954 people (24.3%) aged 45 to 64, and 5,671 people (7.3%) who were 65 or older. The median age was 33.2 years. For every 100 females, there were 105.7 males. For every 100 females age 18 and over, there were 105.2 males.

There were 21,797 housing units at an average density of 735.1 per square mile, of the occupied units 14,315 (68.9%) were owner-occupied and 6,457 (31.1%) were rented. The homeowner vacancy rate was 2.1%; the rental vacancy rate was 6.4%. 49,280 people (63.2% of the population) lived in owner-occupied housing units and 21,639 people (27.7%) lived in rental housing units.

According to the 2010 United States Census, Chino had a median household income of $71,671, with 9.6% of the population living below the federal poverty line.

2000
At the 2000 census there were 67,168 people in 17,304 households, including 14,102 families, in the city. The population density was 3,190.5 inhabitants per square mile (1,232.0/km). The racial makeup of the city was 55.7% White, 7.8% African American, 0.9% Native American, 4.9% Asian, 0.2% Pacific Islander, 25.6% from other races, and 4.9% from two or more races. Hispanic or Latino people of any race were 47.4%.

Of the 17,304 households 47.3% had children under the age of 18 living with them, 62.5% were married couples living together, 12.9% had a female householder with no husband present, and 18.5% were non-families. 14.1% of households were one person and 5.2% were one person aged 65 or older. The average household size was 3.4 and the average family size was 3.8.

The age distribution was 28.5% under the age of 18, 12.3% from 18 to 24, 34.2% from 25 to 44, 19.2% from 45 to 64, and 5.9% 65 or older. The median age was 31 years. For every 100 females, there were 124.3 males. For every 100 females age 18 and over, there were 133.1 males.

The median household income was $55,401 and the median family income  was $59,638. Males had a median income of $35,855 versus $30,267 for females. The per capita income for the city was $17,574. About 6.3% of families and 8.3% of the population were below the poverty line, including 10.0% of those under age 18 and 8.5% of those age 65 or over.

Government
The city is governed by a five-member council consisting of a mayor plus four councilmembers. The mayor is elected at-large and council members are elected by district; all serve four-year terms. The city manager and city attorney are appointed by the council. The city's elections, which are plurality, are held on a Tuesday after the first Monday in November of even-numbered years.

Federal and state representation

Notable people
 Diana Taurasi, guard for the Phoenix Mercury
 George Uko, NFL player
 Shelly Martinez, WWE wrestler

Local attractions 
 Planes of Fame is an air museum at Chino Airport.
 Yanks Air Museum is another air museum at Chino Airport.

See also 

 List of largest California cities by population

References

External links

 

 
Chino Hills (California)
Cities in San Bernardino County, California
Pomona Valley
Populated places in San Bernardino County, California
Populated places on the Santa Ana River
Incorporated cities and towns in California
Populated places established in 1887
1887 establishments in California